The 1932 United States Senate election in North Carolina was held on November 8, 1932. Interim Democratic Senator Cameron A. Morrison ran for election to a full term, but was defeated in the Democratic primary by Robert Rice Reynolds. Reynolds defeated Republican Jacob F. Newell in the general election.

Background
Incumbent Senator Lee S. Overman died on December 12, 1930. Governor of North Carolina Oliver Max Gardner appointed Cameron A. Morrison, a former Governor, to fill Overman's vacant seat until a successor could be duly elected.

A special election to complete Overman's term was scheduled for the same day as the 1932 election to the next term. Primaries for both elections were held on June 4.

Democratic primary

Candidates
Thomas C. Bowie, State Representative from Jefferson
Frank D. Grist, State Commissioner of Labor
Cameron A. Morrison, interim Senator since 1930
Robert Rice Reynolds, Asheville attorney and candidate for Senate in 1926
Arthur Simmons

Results

Runoff

Republican primary

Candidates
George W. DePriest
Jacob F. Newell

Results

General election

Results

Footnotes

1932
North Carolina
1932 North Carolina elections